Backlog may refer to:

Science, technology and business 
 Product backlog, a list of requirements for a software product in development; see 
 Backlog (academic journals), the phenomenon of a number of accepted papers waiting a significant time to be published
 Backlog of unexamined patent applications, all patent applications that have been filed and still remain to be examined
 An argument to Berkeley sockets "listen" function representing the number of pending connections 
 Customer lead time in sales and operations planning

Music 
 Backlog (album), a compilation by Leftfield/Djum Djum
 Backlog 1987–1991 (1995), an album by Show of Hands
 Backlog 2 (2011), an album by Show of Hands

See also 
 Tardiness (scheduling), a measure of a delay in executing certain operations